18th Nova Scotia general election may refer to:

Nova Scotia general election, 1847, the 18th general election to take place in the Colony of Nova Scotia, for the 18th General Assembly of Nova Scotia
1937 Nova Scotia general election, the 40th overall general election for Nova Scotia, for the (due to a counting error in 1859) 41st Legislative Assembly of Nova Scotia, but considered the 18th general election for the Canadian province of Nova Scotia